Jack Alan Davies (born 3 December 2002) is an English professional footballer who plays as a defender for National League South club Concord Rangers, on loan from  club Milton Keynes Dons.

Club career

Milton Keynes Dons
Davies joined the academy of Milton Keynes Dons at a young age, and progressed through several age groups. He signed his first professional contract with the club on 24 August 2020. Davies made his professional debut on 11 November 2020, in a 1–2 EFL Trophy group stage home defeat to Southampton U21s, and later that season made his league debut on 16 January 2021 as a 77th-minute substitute in a 3–0 away defeat to Peterborough United.

The 2021–22 season saw limited first team opportunities for Davies, and he spent the first half of the season out on loan to National League South club Oxford City. On 7 August 2022, Davies returned to National League South on loan to Concord Rangers.

Career statistics

References

2002 births
Living people
Association football defenders
English footballers
Milton Keynes Dons F.C. players
Oxford City F.C. players
Concord Rangers F.C. players